It's Okay, Daddy's Girl is a South Korean television series that aired on SBS from November 22, 2010 to January 28, 2011.

Plot
Being the youngest and spoiled in her family, Eun Chae-ryung would completely rely on her father. When he has brain hemorrhage one day, she begins to realize that she must grow out of her sheltered life and face numerous hardships before becoming independent.

Cast
Eun family
Moon Chae-won as Eun Chae-ryung
Lee Hee-jin as Eun Ae-ryung
Kang Won as Eun Ho-ryung
Park In-hwan as Eun Ki-hwan
Kim Hye-ok as Heo Sook-hee
Yoo Seung-mok as Heo Man-soo

Choi family
Choi Jin-hyuk as Choi Hyuk-ki
Shin Min-soo as Choi Duk-ki
Lee Donghae as Choi Wook-ki
Lee Bong-gyu as Hyuk-ki's father
Lee Yong-nyeo as Hyuk-ki's mother

Jung family
Im Kang-sung as Jung Jin-goo
Jin Se-yeon as Jung Se-yeon
Choi Ja-hye as Seo Hee-jae
Park Geun-hyung as Jung Pil-suk
Yeon Woon-kyung as Yeo Chang-ja

Park family
Jun Tae-soo as Park Jong-suk
Lee Won-jae as Park Kwon (Jong-suk's father)
Park Hye-jin as Mo Yoon-kyung (Jong-suk's mother)

Extended cast
Kang Min-hyuk as Hwang Yeon-doo
Hong Yeo-jin as Lee Soon-jung
Song In-hwa as Go Yang-mi
Jo Han-joon as Park Moo-sool
Kim Dong-gyoon as Kwak Kyun-woo
Han Soo-min as Geum Joo-hye
Nam Ji-hyun as Shin Sun-hae
Hwang Sun-hee as Ma Ri-sol
Min Ji-oh as Kang Bo-ra
Kim Gyu-jin as Shim Byung-chun
Park Sang-hoon as Shin Sun-do
Park Jung-geun as Kang Dong-bo
Marco as Marco
Sung Chang-hoon as Ricardo
Song Yi-woo as Jo Ah-ra
Seo Dong-soo as Professor Kang
Lee Jin-ah as Jun So-hyung
Yoo Byung-sun as Min Hyun-gyo
Lee Sun-ah as Ah-young
Yeom Dong-heon as Ah-young's father
Choi Sung Joon as Doctor Hong
Kim Min-seo as Park Da-bin
Lee Do-yeop

Ratings

Notes

References

External links
It's Okay, Daddy's Girl official SBS website 

Seoul Broadcasting System television dramas
2010 South Korean television series debuts
2011 South Korean television series endings
Korean-language television shows